Tokunoshima Dam  is a rockfill dam located in Kagoshima Prefecture in Japan. The dam is used for irrigation. The catchment area of the dam is 28.6 km2. The dam impounds about 63  ha of land when full and can store 8120 thousand cubic meters of water. The construction of the dam was started on 1994 and completed in 2015.

See also
List of dams in Japan

References

Dams in Kagoshima Prefecture